Events from the year 1840 in the United States.

Incumbents

Federal Government 
 President: Martin Van Buren (D-New York)
 Vice President: Richard M. Johnson (D-Kentucky)
 Chief Justice: Roger B. Taney (Maryland)
 Speaker of the House of Representatives: Robert Mercer Taliaferro Hunter (W-Virginia)
 Congress: 26th

Events
 January 13–14 – The steamship Lexington burns and sinks in icy waters, 4 miles off the coast of Long Island; 139 die, only 4 survive.
 January 19 – Captain Charles Wilkes circumnavigates Antarctica, claiming what becomes known as Wilkes Land for the United States.
 March 4 – Alexander S. Wolcott and John Johnson open their "Daguerreian Parlor" on Broadway (Manhattan), the world's first commercial photography portrait studio.
 March 9 – The Wilmington and Raleigh Railroad is completed from Wilmington, North Carolina to Weldon, North Carolina.  At 161.5 miles, it was the world's longest railroad at the time.
 April – The Raleigh and Gaston Railroad is completed from Raleigh, North Carolina to near Weldon, North Carolina.
 May 7 – The Great Natchez Tornado: A massive tornado strikes Natchez, Mississippi during the early afternoon hours. Before it is over, 317 people are killed and 109 injured. It is the second deadliest tornado in U.S. history.
 November 7 – U.S. presidential election, 1840: William Henry Harrison defeats Martin Van Buren.

Ongoing
 Second Seminole War (1835–1842)

Births
 January 1 – Patrick Walsh, Irish-born U.S. Senator from Georgia from 1894 to 1895 (died 1899)
 January 29 – Henry H. Rogers, financier (died 1909)
 February 4 – Hiram Stevens Maxim, firearms inventor (died 1916)
 February 9 – William T. Sampson, U.S. Navy admiral (died 1902)
 March 5 – Constance Fenimore Woolson, fiction writer and poet (died 1894)
 April 28 – Caroline Shawk Brooks, sculptor (died 1913)
 May 1  –  Cynthia S. Burnett, educator, temperance reformer, and newspaper editor (died 1932)
 May 4 – George Gray, U.S. Senator from Delaware from 1885 to 1899 (died 1925)
 June 3 – Michael O'Laughlen, conspirator in the assassination of Abraham Lincoln in 1865 (died 1867)
 June 6 – William Dudley Chipley, railroad tycoon and statesman (died 1897)
 June 14 – William F. Nast, attaché, railroad executive and inventor (died 1893)
 June 27 – Alpheus Beede Stickney, railroad executive (died 1916)
 July 10 – Esther G. Frame, Quaker minister and evangelist (died 1920)
 July 21 – Christian Abraham Fleetwood, Union Army 4th Colored Infantry Regiment soldier and Medal of Honor recipient (died 1914)
 August 25 – George C. Magoun, railroad executive (died 1893)
 August 28 – Ira D. Sankey, gospel singer and composer (died 1908)
 September 10 – William B. Avery, Union Army soldier and Medal of Honor recipient (died 1894)
 September 22 – D. M. Canright, Seventh-day Adventist minister and author, later one of the church's severest critics (died 1919)
 September 27 – Alfred Thayer Mahan, U.S. Navy admiral, geostrategist and historian (died 1914)
 September 23 – Simon B. Conover, U.S. Senator from Florida from 1873 to 1879 (died 1908)
 October 1 – Anthony Higgins, U.S. Senator from Delaware from 1889 to 1895 (died 1912)
 October 24 – Eliza Pollock, American archer (died 1919)
 November 24 – John Brashear, astronomer (died 1920)
 Earliest probable date – Crazy Horse (Tȟašúŋke Witkó), Chief of the Oglala Lakota (killed 1877)

Deaths
 March 11 – George Wolf, politician (born 1777)
 March 23 – William Maclure, geologist (born 1763 in Scotland; died in Mexico)
 April 7 – Thaddeus Betts, U.S. Senator from Connecticut from 1839 to 1840 (born 1789)
 August 10 – Seymour Brunson, early Mormon convert (born 1798)
 August 27 – William Kneass, second Chief Engraver of the United States Mint from 1824 to 1840 (born 1781)
 September 14 – Joseph Smith Sr., 1st Presiding Patriarch of the Latter Day Saint movement (born 1771)
 September 18 – Constantine Samuel Rafinesque, French polymath (born 1783 in the Ottoman Empire)
 June 14 – Anson Brown, lawyer and U.S. Representative from New York from 1839 to 1840 (born 1800)

See also
Timeline of United States history (1820–1859)

References

External links
 

 
1840s in the United States
United States
United States
Years of the 19th century in the United States